Pseudochromis kolythrus is a species of ray-finned fish from Récif Mbere, New Caledonia in the Western Pacific, which is a member of the family Pseudochromidae.

References

kolythrus
Taxa named by Anthony C. Gill
Taxa named by Richard Winterbottom
Fish described in 1993